A list of synagogues in the Greater Toronto Area, a region with a large Jewish population. Most are located along Bathurst Street in Toronto, North York and Thornhill, but some are located in areas of newer Jewish immigrants.

Where, prior to World War II there used to be over 30 synagogues in the area in and Kensington Market, Spadina Avenue and Bathurst Street south of Bloor, today only four remain as many of the older buildings were sold when congregations relocated north of St. Clair Avenue in the 1950s and 1960s following the migration of the Jewish population up Bathurst Street.

A

Adath Israel Congregation, Toronto, Ontario
 Agudath Israel of Toronto Congregation
 Agudath Israel Anshei Keltz, Toronto, Ontario
Aish HaTorah, Thornhill, Ontario
 Anshei Minsk, Toronto, Ontario

B
 Beach Hebrew Institute, Toronto, Ontario
 Beit Rayim Synagogue, Vaughan, Ontario
 Beth Avraham Yoseph of Toronto
 Beth David B'nai Israel Beth Am, Toronto, Ontario
 Beth Emeth Bais Yehuda Synagogue, Toronto, Ontario
 Beth Jacob, Toronto, Ontario
 Beth Lida Forest Hill Synagogue, Toronto, Ontario
 Beth Radom Congregation, Toronto, Ontario
 Beth Sholom Synagogue, Toronto, Ontario
 Beth Tikvah Synagogue, Toronto, Ontario
 Beth Torah Congregation, Toronto, Ontario
 Beth Tzedec Congregation, Toronto, Ontario
 Beth Zion Congregation, Oshawa, Ontario
 B'nai Shalom V'Tikvah, Ajax, Ontario

C
 City Shul, Toronto, Ontario
 Chabad Flamingo, Thornhill, Ontario
 Chabad-Lubavitch of Markham, Markham, Ontario
 Chabad Romano Centre, Maple, Ontario
 Chabad of Maple, Maple, Ontario
 Chabad Lubavitch Community Centre, Thornhill, Ontario
 Clanton Park Synagogue, Toronto, Ontario
 Congregation Habonim Toronto
Congregation Beth Haminyan, Toronto, Ontario 
 Congregation B'nai Torah, Toronto, Ontario
 Congregation Chasidei Bobov, Toronto, Ontario
 Congregation Tiferes Bais Yaacov, Toronto, Ontario
 Chabad Lubavitch on the East Side, Toronto, Canada

D
 Darchei Noam, Toronto, Ontario

E
Emunah Shleima Synagogue, Toronto, Ontario

F
 First Narayever Congregation, Toronto, Ontario
 First Russian Congregation, "Kiever Synagogue", Toronto, Ontario
Forest Hill Jewish Centre, Toronto, Ontario

H
 Har Tikvah Congregation, Brampton, Ontario
Holy Blossom Temple, Toronto, Ontario

J
Jewish Russian Community Centres (JRCC) of Ontario
JRCC of North Ontario
JRCC of East Ontario
JRCC Concord (Confederation Pkwy)
JRCC Rockford (18 Rockford Rd.)
JRCC West Rockford
JRCC South Richmond Hill / Maple (9699 Bathurst St.)
JRCC East Thornhill (7608 Yonge St)
JRCC South Thornhill (28 Townsgate)
JRCC West Thornhill (1136 Centre St)
JRCC North Thornhill
JRCC Willowdale (17 Church St)
JRCC Woodbridge (12 Muscadel)

K
Kehila Centre, Thornhill, Ontario
 Kehillat Shaarei Torah, Toronto, Ontario
 Kehilat Melech Yisrael, Toronto, Ontario
Knesseth Israel, Toronto, Ontario
Kol Torah, Thornhill, Ontario
 Khal Toras Chesed, Toronto, Ontario
 Kol Yisroel Congregation, Toronto, Ontario

L
 Lodzer Centre Congregation, Toronto, Ontario

M

 Magen David Sephardic Congregation, Toronto, Ontario
 Maon Noam Synagogue, Toronto, Ontario
 Mishkan Avraham, Toronto, Ontario

O
Oraynu Congregation, Toronto, Ontario
Or Hadash Synagogue, Newmarket, Ontario

P
 Petah Tikva Anshe Castilla, Toronto, Ontario
 Pride of Israel Synagogue, Toronto, Ontario

R

 The Richmond Hill Country Shul, Richmond Hill, Ontario

S

 Shaarei Beth-El Synagogue, Oakville, Ontario
Shaarei Shomayim Congregation, Toronto, Ontario
 Shaarei Tefillah Congregation, Toronto, Ontario
Shaarei Tzedec Synagogue (The Markham Shul), Toronto, Ontario
 Shomrai Shabbos Synagogue, Toronto, Ontario
 Solel Congregation of Mississauga, Mississauga, Ontario
 The Song Shul, Toronto, Ontario

 Stashover-Slipia Congregation, Toronto, Ontario

T

 Temple Emanu-El, Toronto, Ontario
 Temple Har Zion, Thornhill, Ontario
 Temple Kol Ami, Vaughan, Ontario
 Temple Sinai Congregation of Toronto
 Tent City Jewish Congregation, Innisfil, Ontario
 Thornhill Woods Shul, Thornhill, Ontario
 Tiferet Israel Congregation, Toronto, Ontario
 Torah Emeth Congregation, Toronto, Ontario

V
 The Village Shul, Toronto, Ontario

W
 Westmount Shul and Learning Centre, Thornhill, Ontario

See also
 History of the Jews in Toronto

References

Religious buildings and structures in Toronto
Synagogues in the Greater Toronto Area
Toronto
Synagogues in Toronto